The 1966 Women's Western Open was contested from August 18–21 at Rainbow Springs Country Club. It was the 37th edition of the Women's Western Open.

This event was won by Mickey Wright.

Final leaderboard

External links
The Victoria Advocate source

Women's Western Open
Golf in Wisconsin
Women's Western Open
Women's Western Open
Women's Western Open
Women's Western Open
Women's sports in Wisconsin